Asa Andrew, sometimes styled as "Dr. Asa, America's Health Coach", is an American author and radio host. He has a daily syndicated health talk radio show, Dr. Asa On Call; his book Empowering Your Health was published in 2007. In 2015 he was a member of the American College of Lifestyle Medicine.

Radio and television

Andrew started his radio career with his radio show 'Dr. Asa On Call' which now airs 3 hours daily syndicated on networks including Cumulus Media, iHeart Radio, Salem Communications.

Bibliography
 Empowering Your Health: Do You Want to Get Well?, Foreword by Dave Ramsey (Thomas Nelson Incorporated, 2007)

References

Living people
American health and wellness writers
Year of birth missing (living people)